Brown and Black Asteroid is an outdoor sculpture and replica of the Willamette Meteorite by an unknown artist, installed outside the University of Oregon Museum of Natural and Cultural History in Eugene, Oregon, in the United States.

Description
The Smithsonian Institution, which surveyed the work as part of its "Save Outdoor Sculpture!" program in 1994, suggests the sculpture is made of wire mesh, fiberglass, and resin. Smithsonian considers the work abstract and deemed its condition "treatment needed" the year it was surveyed. It is administered by the University of Oregon.

References

External links
 Willamette Meteorite, Eugene, Oregon at Waymarking

Fiberglass sculptures in Oregon
Outdoor sculptures in Eugene, Oregon
Resin sculptures
University of Oregon campus